Alucita cancellata is a moth of the family Alucitidae. It is found in France, Spain, Italy, Croatia, Romania and the Republic of Macedonia. It was first described from Syria and is further known from Iran, Israel, Turkey and Russia.

The wingspan is 15–16 mm. The forewings are white, with four subquadrate fuscous spots edged with black on the anterior half of the costa. The hindwings are white, the basal area ochreous tinged and spotted with dark fuscous.

References

External links

Images representing  Alucita cancellata at Consortium for the Barcode of Life

Moths described in 1908
Alucitidae
Moths of Europe
Moths of the Middle East
Taxa named by Edward Meyrick